In December 2016, 74 people died in a mass methanol poisoning in the Russian city of Irkutsk. Precipitated by drinking counterfeit surrogate alcohol, the Associated Press news agency called its high death toll "unprecedented in its scale".

Russian use of non-traditional surrogate alcohols rose rapidly in the early 2010s due to ongoing economic difficulties. Costing less than government-regulated vodka, surrogates reached an estimated height of twenty percent of the country's alcohol consumption by 2016. These products were often nearly pure alcohol that could be diluted to a rough approximation of vodka, and were commonly available from supermarkets, strategically placed vending machines, and other shops. In the Irkutsk incident, the victims drank scented bath lotion that was mislabeled as containing drinkable ethanol.

In the aftermath of the poisoning, regulations on surrogate alcohols were tightened around the country. Politicians announced a temporary ban on non-food items with more than 25 percent alcohol, and the legal minimum price of vodka was lowered.

Causes and event 

In the 2010s, Russia's economy suffered from a financial crisis, depressed oil prices, and international sanctions put into place during the Ukrainian crisis. With less disposable income, citizens were forced to take drastic measures. In 2017, for instance, approximately half of the country's population was growing fruits and vegetables to supplement their diet, caused in part by a doubling in food prices in the preceding two years.

For alcohol, Russian citizens—already one of the highest consumers per capita in the world—turned to surrogates, a cheaper but unregulated segment of the market. Although the country's overall consumption of all kinds of alcohol had been in decline since 2005, as of November 2016, surrogates made up twenty percent of the total alcohol consumed in the country, and their consumption was itself increasing by twenty percent each year. Experts estimated that greater than ten million Russians routinely purchased such alcohol. Such a widespread consumption of unregulated alcohol led to recurring alcohol poisonings. Russia's government agency devoted to consumer protection, Rospotrebnadzor, recorded about 36,000 such poisonings in the first nine months of 2016, resulting in over 9,000 deaths. Nevertheless, the death toll in the single Irkutsk methanol poisoning incident was unusually high. 

The hawthorn-scented bath lotion (boyaryshnik) that caused the Irkutsk mass methanol poisoning was purchased as a drink because it was half the lowest-price vodka. Although the bottles were typically half the size of traditional vodka, their alcohol content was such that they could be diluted to a similar alcohol by volume. These bath lotions were widely available in supermarkets, shops, and vending machines around Russia and were not subject to any legal age requirement; the alcohol excise tax, which had been increased as part of an anti-alcohol effort in 2009; or other restrictions placed in recent years to help curb alcohol consumption in the country. The vending machines were particularly problematic: they were often deliberately placed near poorer areas of Russian cities to appeal to those seeking a cheap alternative to regular alcohol. Moreover, unlike legal alcohol sales the vending machines were available at all hours of the day or night. They were also highly profitable. "Everybody knew that it was not bath oil", one individual later told The New York Times. "That label was just meant to fend off the inspectors". 

The fatal batch of lotion involved in the December 2016 mass poisoning was made with methanol (methyl alcohol, wood alcohol, CH3OH), which is poisonous to the central nervous system and other parts of the body. Methanol is cheaper than ethanol (ethyl alcohol, grain alcohol, CH3CH2OH), the alcohol found in vodka and other alcoholic drinks. The two alcohols are similar in many respects and cannot readily be distinguished, and their contents differed from the labels on the bottles, which indicated that they contained ethanol. An investigation later revealed that the methanol was usually used in the local production of windshield washer fluid, known locally as antifreeze.

According to early reports on 19 December, a total of 57 people were hospitalized, with 49 dying. The victims were described as being poor residents of the Novo-Lenino neighborhood in Irkutsk, ranging in age between 25 and 62 (with most being 35 to 50). As days went by, subsequent reports increased the number of impacted people: first to 55 deaths (with a total of 94 affected), then 62 (with 107 affected), 77 (number of affected not given), and 78.

A January 2017 medical investigation established that 74 people died due to methanol poisoning, with the remaining 4 deaths being caused by drinking too much non-fraudulent ethanol-based bath lotion. A total of 123 people were hospitalized. About a third of them were found in their homes, having died before being able to call for an ambulance. Of the remainder, a problem in attempting to treat them was that fomepizole, a methanol antidote, is not certified for use in Russia and is therefore not available in the country's hospitals. Overall, the victims included a doctor, teachers, nurses, and drivers; The New York Times described the majority as holding "steady if low-paying jobs".

Aftermath
In the immediate aftermath of the poisoning, a state of emergency was declared. Twenty-three people involved in the production of the lotion were detained by Russian authorities, many of which were local vendors who sold the product, and one senior regional government official for the greater Siberian region being charged with negligence. About  of remaining counterfeit lotion were seized from the underground facility where it had been produced, and a few days later  of methanol-containing liquid was seized from a warehouse in Irkutsk. A further five people were arrested in January 2017, charged with selling and publicizing surrogate alcohol. In February 2020, the last of 19 individuals jailed or fined for distributing the fraudulent alcohol was sentenced to 2.5 years in prison.

After the incident, a spokesperson for Russian president Vladimir Putin called it a "terrible tragedy", blaming it on a failing of "supervisory bodies", and added: "What happened in Irkutsk was a tremendous tragedy. Words fail me. Certainly this was an outrage because the inspectors and other agencies were supposed to prevent it, and didn't do so." Dmitry Medvedev, the prime minister, called for a ban on non-traditional alcoholic liquids like the bath lotion, stating that "it's an outrage, and we need to put an end to this". Days later, the Russian news agency Interfax reported that Putin planned to lower taxes on alcohol in an effort to curb the use of unsafe alcohol substitutes, requiring officials to present a plan by 31 March 2017.

On 22 December, Putin announced that regulations on products with more than 25 percent alcohol would be tightened, and punishments would be increased for those who break manufacturing and distribution laws related to them. In addition, deputy prime minister Alexander Khloponin publicly supported tightening access to "medications" like boyaryshnik through requiring pharmaceutical prescriptions.

On the following day, Medvedev ordered Rospotrebnadzor, the federal consumer rights protection agency, to ban all sales of non-food items with more than 25 percent alcohol. Their 30-day order came into effect on 26 December and was scheduled to run for one month before being extended for a further 60 days in January, March, and July; the restrictions did not cover perfumes and glass-cleaning products. Further restrictions were considered, with one top health official announcing that a state monopoly may be imposed on Russia's perfume and pharmaceutical industries. In the end, Russia amended its legal code to strengthen punishments for illegally producing and selling alcohol, banning the kind of alcoholic vending machines through which the Irkutsk bath lotion was sold, and prohibiting online advertisements of alcoholic retailers. The latter's legalization had been mooted prior to the poisoning. Furthermore, the minimum legal price of vodka was lowered in both January and May 2017.

Individuals interviewed by a New York Times reporter in February 2017 were skeptical that any measures would be successful in significantly impacting illegal alcohol sales, given that it was such a high percentage of the total market for alcohol. Indeed, vendors in Irkutsk reported that sales of surrogate alcohols did not decline after the poisoning, and 2018 surveys conducted in Udmurtia in western Russia showed that unregulated medicinal alcohol was still widely available. Nevertheless, Rospotrebnadzor announced at the end of January 2017 that the country had seen its first decline in monthly alcohol poisoning deaths in five years, and one study linked the new regulations to a sharp drop in deaths and an increase in life expectancy between 2016 and 2017 among Russia's population of working-age men.

See also 
 List of methanol poisoning incidents
 Prohibition in the Russian Empire and the Soviet Union

References

Further reading 

2016 disasters in Russia
2016 health disasters
2016 scandals
Alcohol in Russia
December 2016 events in Russia
Health disasters in Russia
Mass methanol poisoning
Methanol poisoning incidents